WHWD-LD, virtual channel 21 (UHF digital channel 15), is a low-powered Daystar owned-and-operated television station serving Charlotte, North Carolina, United States that is licensed to Statesville. The station is owned by the Word of God Fellowship. The station's transmitter is located near Northview.

Digital channels 
The station's digital signal is multiplexed:

References

External links

WSIC-AM 1400

HWD-LD
Television channels and stations established in 1993
1993 establishments in North Carolina
Low-power television stations in the United States
Religious television stations in the United States